Mount Salisbury is a peak in the Fairweather Range of Alaska, 6 miles (10 km) southeast of Mount Fairweather. Its east slopes feed one of the northern branches of the Johns Hopkins Glacier, which flows into Glacier Bay. On its western side is a large cirque, shared with Mount Fairweather, Mount Quincy Adams, and Lituya Mountain, which heads the Fairweather Glacier; this flows almost to the Pacific coast at Cape Fairweather.

Mount Salisbury is not often climbed, partly due to its proximity to the higher and better-known Mount Fairweather, and partly due to difficult access and the typically bad weather that this range possesses.

References

External links
 Mount Salisbury on Topozone

Salisbury
Salisbury, Mount
Mountains of Unorganized Borough, Alaska
Salisbury